Alloispermum is a genus of flowering plants in the family Asteraceae described as a genus in 1807.

Alloispermum is native to Mexico, Central America, and northwestern South America.

 Species

References

Millerieae
Asteraceae genera